Novak Djokovic defeated Jo-Wilfried Tsonga in the final, 6–2, 6–4 to win the singles tennis title at the 2015 Shanghai Masters. He did not lose a single set in the entire tournament.

Roger Federer was the defending champion, but lost in the second round to Albert Ramos Viñolas.

Seeds
The top eight seeds receive a bye into the second round.

Draw

Finals

Top half

Section 1

Section 2

Bottom half

Section 3

Section 4

Qualifying

Seeds

Qualifiers

Lucky loser
  Donald Young

Qualifying draw

First qualifier

Second qualifier

Third qualifier

Fourth qualifier

Fifth qualifier

Sixth qualifier

Seventh qualifier

References
 Main Draw
 Qualifying Draw

Singles